Thagoona railway station is located on the Main line in Queensland, Australia. It serves the Ipswich suburb of Thagoona.  The station opened in 1888 as Raeside, being renamed Thagoona shortly afterwards.

Services
Thagoona is served by City network services from Rosewood to Ipswich. Most services terminate at Ipswich although some peak-hour services continue to Bowen Hills and Caboolture.

Services by platform

References

External links

Thagoona station Queensland Rail
Thagoona station Queensland's Railways on the Internet
[ Thagoona station] TransLink travel information

Thagoona, Queensland
Railway stations in Australia opened in 1888
Railway stations in Ipswich City
Main Line railway, Queensland